James Wright Munro (22 February 1870  –  27 May 1945) was a New Zealand politician of the Labour Party.

Early life
Munro was born in Dunedin in 1870. He was a baker by trade, and president of the Dunedin Bakers' Union in 1907. He started his own business in partnership with Peter Neilson (who also became a Labour MP) after victimisation by employers. Munro was president of the Dunedin branch of the Independent Political Labour League (IPLL) in 1907. In 1911, he was national president of the New Zealand Socialist Party.

Political career

On this occasion, he was beaten by John A. Millar of the Liberal Party.

Statham resigned after the election after irregularities in the counting of the vote turned a 12-vote lead for Munro into a 12-vote loss. Munro and Statham contested the resulting , which was narrowly won by Statham.

The incumbent was successful.

In 1935, he was awarded the King George V Silver Jubilee Medal.

He was not appointed a minister in 1935 as he had a reputation for being lazy, and had embarrassed Savage a week before the 1935 election by stating that:
"if anyone tried to stop a Labour government carrying out its policy, Labour might have to ‘smash things’ and put directors and managers in gaol on a bread and water diet ‘as some of our Communist friends were dealt with’ until they learnt to obey the government".

He was on the Dunedin City Council (1927–1945) and Otago Harbour Board. From 1937 until 1938 he was Deputy Mayor of Dunedin. He died in Dunedin on 27 May 1945, and his ashes were buried at Andersons Bay Cemetery.

He lost to National MP Tom Macdonald. He later sought the Labour nomination at the 1953 North Dunedin by-election but was not selected.

Notes

References

|-

1870 births
1945 deaths
New Zealand Labour Party MPs
United Labour Party (New Zealand) politicians
Independent Political Labour League politicians
New Zealand Socialist Party politicians
Dunedin City Councillors
Deputy mayors of places in New Zealand
New Zealand MPs for Dunedin electorates
Members of the New Zealand House of Representatives
Unsuccessful candidates in the 1908 New Zealand general election
Unsuccessful candidates in the 1911 New Zealand general election
Unsuccessful candidates in the 1914 New Zealand general election
Unsuccessful candidates in the 1919 New Zealand general election
Unsuccessful candidates in the 1925 New Zealand general election
Burials at Andersons Bay Cemetery